The Viiala railway station is located in the town of Akaa (formerly the municipality of Viiala), Finland, in the urban area and district of Viiala. It is located along the Riihimäki–Tampere railway, and its neighboring stations are Lempäälä in the north and Toijala in the south.

Services 

Viiala is served by VR commuter rail line  on the route Helsinki–Riihimäki–Tampere, as well as line  on the route Toijala–Tampere–Nokia. Southbound trains toward Toijala, Riihimäki and Helsinki use track 1, while northbound trains toward Tampere and Nokia use track 2.

References 

Akaa
Railway stations in Pirkanmaa